Linda Ann Wolf (born March 17, 1950) is an American photographer and author. She is one of the first female rock and roll photographers. Wolf also makes fine art photography with an emphasis on women and global photojournalism.

Early life
Wolf was born in Los Angeles, California, on March 17, 1950, and raised in Sherman Oaks, California. Her mother, Barbara Wolf (née Friedman), is a poet and was a fashion model and English literature teacher at Beverly Hills High School. Her father, Joseph Wolf, was a businessman and avid photographer. Wolf's interest in photography was born out of her father's passion for photography. He bought her first camera for her when she was a teenager.

Wolf attended Hollywood High School and graduated in 1968. In 1969, she began dating Sandy Konikoff, the drummer for Jackson Browne. He invited her to live at Paxton Lodge in the Sierra Nevada Mountains, where Elektra Records was recording one of Browne's first albums. There was a darkroom at the studio, and she was inspired by the experience and made a decision to pursue photography professionally.

Wolf's grandfather, Jules Wolf, managed the historic Lincoln Theater, often called the Apollo of the West.

Rock & roll photography

1969 – Fanny
In 1969, Wolf began working at Warner Bros./Reprise Records, where she met the first all-girl rock band to sign with a major record label, Fanny. They became friends, and she moved in with the group at Fanny Hill, a mansion on Marmont Lane in Hollywood, where she lived for a year and a half as the band's documentary photographer. Over 80 of Wolf's archival photos of Fanny are presented in the documentary of the band, Fanny: The Right to Rock  During her stay, she met Lowell George and band members from Little Feat and began photographing them as well.

1970 – Joe Cocker: Mad Dogs & Englishmen tour

Wolf met Joe Cocker a week before the Joe Cocker: Mad Dogs & Englishmen tour began. He had just arrived in the U.S. and was staying with his roadie and keyboard player at Leon Russell's house. His record label informed him that he was to start a U.S. tour in six days, but he had just recently broken with his band, The Grease Band. Russell offered to quickly assemble a touring band, and recruited over 40 of his friends. Denny Cordell, who produced the tour, invited Wolf along after seeing her photography. She and Andee Nathanson were the two official photographers for the two-month U.S. concert tour, which included  Russell, Rita Coolidge, Chris Stainton, Claudia Lennear, Bobby Keys, Pamela Polland, Matthew Moore, and musicians representing the Tulsa Sound including Carl Radle, Jim Keltner, and Chuck Blackwell.

The music documentary Joe Cocker: Mad Dogs & Englishmen was released in 1971 and credited Wolf for her tour photography.

Wolf authored Joe Cocker: Mad Dogs & Englishmen: A Memory Book, which included over 150 new photographs, quotes and stories from alumni. It was released in 2015 at the Lockn' Festival.

On September 11, 2015, Wolf joined the Tedeschi Trucks Band & Friends and alumni from the 1970 Mad Dogs & Englishmen Tour, as the official photographer, and sang in the encore with the Space Choir, for a tribute concert to honor Joe Cocker and the Mad Dogs and Englishmen music. Participating alumni included Leon Russell, Rita Coolidge, Claudia Lennear, Chris Stainton, and Pamela Polland.

Cocker died on December 22, 2014, and Wolf's photographs were used in articles written about his life and music legacy by the Associated Press.

2020 - Tribute: Cocker Power
On April 28, 2020, Insight Editions released Tribute: Cocker Power, a 335-page coffee table book featuring Wolf's documentary photos, tour alumni stories, and vignettes from the Joe Cocker: Mad Dogs & Englishmen Tour and the 2015 tribute concert at the Lockn' Festival led by the Tedeschi Trucks Band with Leon Russell and original tour alumni. The book, which received favorable reviews, was released on the 50th anniversary of the tour. It includes contributions from over one hundred musicians and crew members, including Denny Cordell, Leon Russell, Chris Stainton, Rita Coolidge, Claudia Lennear, Derek Trucks, Susan Tedeschi, and Warren Haynes.

Collections
Wolf's photographs are in the collections of:

 Musee Reattu, Arles, France
 Musee Cantini, Marseille, France 
 Musee Het Sterkshof, Antwerp, Belgium 
 Bibliothèque Nationale de France, Paris, France 
 Rock & Roll Hall of Fame, Cleveland, Ohio, US    
 Norton Museum of Art, Palm Beach, California, US
 Women's Building, Los Angeles, California, US
 Photographic Center of the Tokyo Fuji Art Museum, Tokyo, Japan
 Harborview Medical Center Hand Wing Gallery, Seattle, Washington, US

Exhibitions

Group exhibitions: 1980–2021

 USC Fisher Galley Museum of Art, Sight Specific: LACPS and the Politics of Community, Los Angeles, California
 National Museum of Women in the Arts: Women who Rock, Washington, DC, US
 L.A.C.E., Los Angeles Contemporary Exhibitions, Los Angeles, California, US
 Rencontres de la Photographie d'Arles, Arles, France
 Sala San José de Caracciolos de la Universidad de Alcalá, Madrid, Spain
 Bainbridge Island Museum of Art: "Women in Photography", Bainbridge Island, Washington US
 Bainbridge Island Museum of Art: "Breathe" Bainbridge Island, Washington US

In 1981, Wolf exhibited her Bus Bench Mural Project at Rencontres d'Arles in Arles, France.

Her photography was included in the Multicultural Focus exhibition at the Los Angeles Municipal Art Gallery, in Barnsdall Park. In 2012, the 12 artists from the original Los Angeles Municipal Art Gallery were brought back together to show new work at the Arena 1 Gallery: Refocus: Multicultural Focus: an initiative of the J.Paul Getty’s Pacific Standard Time.

Solo exhibitions
 1972 – La Chapelle des Penitents Bleus, Aix-en-Provence, France
 1973 – Le Chateau de Goult, Aix-en-Provence, France
 1973 – L'Ancienne Poste, Goult, France
 2013 – Grace Church; Global Portraits, Bainbridge Island, Washington, US

Wolf conceived and co-curated the 2017 Women in Photography exhibit at the Bainbridge Island Museum of Art, where many of her own photographs were exhibited.

Wolf was a featured guest on the KNBC/PBS series Talk About Pictures in 1981.

Public art projects
In the late 1970s and early 1980s, Wolf created a public art project of murals consisting of photos of ordinary people sitting on bus benches. The photographs were placed on the sides of buses and the backs of bus benches in Los Angeles, San Diego, and Oakland, California in the US, and Arles, France. The benches were conceived as a response to the dehumanizing effects of advertising, and were exhibited in numerous venues including the Los Angeles Municipal Art Gallery and the Rencontres International Festival of Photography in Arles, France. One of the benches sits in the courtyard of Musée Réattu as part of their permanent collection in Arles.

Wolf then developed the project L.A. Welcomes the World, a series of large-scale multicultural portraits of people presented on billboards throughout Los Angeles, for the 1984 Summer Olympics, which was sponsored by Eastman Kodak.

Organizations
 1981 – Co-founder of Women in Photography International, which is archived in Yale University's Beinecke Rare Book and Manuscript Library, Peter E. Palmquist Collection
 1993 – Co-founder of The Daughters Sisters Project, now called Teen Talking Circles, a non-profit organization supporting girl's empowerment, gender relationships, and youth activism

Books and documentaries
Wolf has authored five books and three documentary shorts featuring her photography: 
 1997 – Daughters of the Moon, Sisters of the Sun: Young Women and Mentors on the Transition to Womanhood
 2005 – Speaking and Listening From the Heart, The Art of Facilitating Teen Talking Circles<ref>Wolf, Linda, Welton, Neva. Speaking and Listening from the Heart", 2005.</ref>
 2012 – Bridge of Glass: My mother and me: the relationship with my mother, poet, Barbara Wolf 2014 – I Am A Full Woman (documentary)
 2015 – Global Uprising: Confronting the Tyrannies of the 21st Century: Stories from a New Generation of Activists 2015 – Joe Cocker Mad Dogs & Englishmen Memory Book 2018 – The Caravan: Seeking Asylum in the United States  2020 - Tribute: Cocker PowerContributions to published books and films:
 1984 – Twenty-Four Hours in the Life of LA - Alfred van der Marck Editions
 2010 – Leon Russell - Tulsa Area Music Archives
 2011 – Rock and Roll Hall of Fame Induction Video: Joe Cocker, Mad Dogs and Englishmen (film, 1970)
 2012 – Making Wet: The Magazine of Gourmet Bathing - Imperfect Publishing
 2012 – Twenty Feet From Stardom: Leon Russell Montage (film)
 2013 – Willin': The Story of Little Feat - Da Capo Press
 2015 – Land of a Thousand Bridges: The June Millington Autobiography 2016 – Delta Lady: the Autobiography of Rita Coolidge 2017 – Intensa Levedad: Pury Estalayo''

Education
Wolf graduated from Hollywood High School in 1968.

From 1970 to 1975, she lived and studied in Provence, France, attending the Institute for American Universities, and L'Ecole Experimental Photographic.

Her early photographic work in France focused on people and village life in the Vaucluse Mountains.

Upon returning to the US, Wolf attended Evergreen State College in Olympia, Washington. She taught photography through the University of California at Los Angeles Extension and worked as a staff photographer for the Los Angeles Citywide Mural Project.

References

American photographers
20th-century American writers
American feminists
1950 births
Living people
American women photographers
21st-century American writers
21st-century American women writers
20th-century American women writers